Judges 16 is the sixteenth chapter of the Book of Judges in the Old Testament or the Hebrew Bible. According to Jewish tradition the book was attributed to the prophet Samuel, but modern scholars view it as part of the Deuteronomistic History, which spans in the books of Deuteronomy to 2 Kings, attributed to nationalistic and devotedly Yahwistic writers during the time of the reformer Judean king Josiah in 7th century BCE. This chapter records the activities of judges Samson. belonging to a section comprising Judges 13 to 16 and Judges 6:1 to 16:31.

Text
This chapter was originally written in the Hebrew language. It is divided into 31 verses.

Textual witnesses
Some early manuscripts containing the text of this chapter in Hebrew are of the Masoretic Text tradition, which includes the Codex Cairensis (895), Aleppo Codex (10th century), and Codex Leningradensis (1008). 

Extant ancient manuscripts of a translation into Koine Greek known as the Septuagint (originally was made in the last few centuries BCE) include Codex Vaticanus (B; B; 4th century) and Codex Alexandrinus (A; A; 5th century).

Analysis

The Two Panels
A linguistic study by Chisholm reveals that the central part in the Book of Judges (Judges 3:7–16:31) can be divided into two panels based on the six refrains that state that the Israelites did evil in Yahweh’s eyes:

Panel One
 A 3:7 
 B 3:12 
And the children of Israel did evil again in the sight of the 
B 4:1 
And the children of Israel did evil again in the sight of the 

Panel Two
A 6:1 
And the children of Israel did evil in the sight of the  
B 10:6 
And the children of Israel did evil again in the sight of the 
B 13:1 
And the children of Israel did evil again in the sight of the 

Furthermore from the linguistic evidence, the verbs used to describe the Lord’s response to Israel’s sin have chiastic patterns and can be grouped to fit the division above:

Panel One
3:8 , “and he sold them,” from the root , 
3:12 , “and he strengthened,” from the root , 
4:2 , “and he sold them,” from the root , 

Panel Two
6:1 , “and he gave them,” from the root , 
10:7 , “and he sold them,” from the root , 
13:1 , “and he gave them,” from the root ,

The Samson Narrative
Chapters 13–16 contains the "Samson Narrative" or "Samson Cycle", a highly structured poetic composition with an 'almost architectonic tightness' from a literary point-of-view. The entire section consists of 3 cantos and 10 subcantos and 30 canticles, as follows:
 Canto I : the birth story of Samson (Judges 13:2–25)
 Canto II : the feats of Samson in Timnah and Judah (Judges 14:1–16:3)
 Canto III : Samson's exploits in the Valley of Sorek and the temple of Dagon (Judges 16:4–31).

The distribution of the 10 subcantos into 3 cantos is a regular 2 + 4 + 4, with the number of canticles per subcanto as follows:
 Canto I: 3 + 3
 Canto II: 3 + 3 + 3 + 5 (3 + 2?)
 Canto III: 2 + 2 + 3 + 3

The number of strophes per canticle in each canto is quite uniform with numerical patterns in Canto II showing a 'concentric symmetry':
 Canto I:  4 + 4 + 4 | 4 + 4 + 4
 Canto Ila:  4 + 3 + 3 | 4 + 4 + 4  | 3 + 3 + 4 (concentric)
 Canto IIb: 4 + 4 + 3 + 4? + 4     (concentric)
 Canto III:  4 + 4  | 4 + 4  | 4 + 4 + 4  | 3 + 3 + 4

The structure regularity within the whole section classifies this composition as a 'narrative poetry' or 'poetic narrative'. 

Besides the thematic symmetry, parts of the narrative shows an observable structure with chapter 13 balances chapter 16 (each consisting of three sub-sections with a fourfold asking and answer discourse at the center) whereas chapters 14 and 15 show a parallelism in form and content.

Structure of Chapter 16
The narrative in chapter 16 has a structure that almost parallels with Judges 13 in terms of text arrangement:

1) encounter with the harlot of Gaza (16:1–3)
2) fourfold asking and answer discourse 16:4–22)
1. First question and answer (16:4–9)
2. Second question and answer (16:10–12)
3. Fourth question and answer(16:13–14)
4. Upbraiding and reply (16:15–22)
3) an inclusion
1. Lords of Philistines and people are present (16:23–24)
2. They "call" Samson; a lad supports (Hebrew: hmhzyq) him (16:25–26)
3. Great numbers are present(16:27)
4. Samson "call" on YHWH; YHWH strengthens (Hebrew: whzqny) him (16:28)
5. Lords of Philistines and people are killed (16:30)

Samson's encounter with the harlot of Gaza (16:1–3)
This brief section foreshadows the longer narrative involving Delilah and follows the earlier patterns. Samson was again attracted to a Philistine woman, a prostitute (or "harlot"), in Gaza and the encounter ended in his superheroic departure, by lifting off the gates of the city at night (verse 3), whereas the enemy planned to capture him the next morning (verse 2).  This episode provides a clue to the false sense of Samson's invincibility, which would soon turn to his downfall, especially as the appeal of Philistine women was seen as Samson's tragic flaw; emphasizing the 'danger of foreign (and loose) women' (Deuteronomy 7:3–4; Proverbs 5:3–6; 7:10–23). Samson's escape from Gaza turned out to be temporary because he would later be brought there again in bronze fetter (verse 21) and had his final confrontation with the Philistines.

Verse 3
And Samson lay low till midnight; then he arose at midnight, took hold of the doors of the gate of the city and the two gateposts, pulled them up, bar and all, put them on his shoulders, and carried them to the top of the hill that faces Hebron. 
"The doors… two gateposts… bar and all": This is a detailed description of a typical Canaan city gates in that period. 
The unnamed hill must have been the closest ridge to the west of Hebron. Hebron was the leading city of Judah at that time, so bringing his "war trophy" there is a way of Samson to show the people of Judah that he would always fight the Philistines alone in his own way.

Samson and Delilah (16:4–22)

The story of Samson's downfall follows the familiar pattern in the cycle:
encounter with a Philistine woman;
attempted entrapment or trickery
counter-trickery or escape.
Samson was finally caught by his enemies, when he was with the third foreign woman, Delilah (Hebrew:), whose name could mean 'loose hair' or 'flirtatiousness', but also a word play on the term for "night" whereas Samson's name derives from the term for "sun" (Hebrew: šemeš). Significantly, Delilah is the only named woman in the Samson Narrative (cf. Samson's mother as "Manoah's wife", Samson's Timnite wife , the harlot in Gaza). The Philistine lords ('tyrants') offered Delilah a reward in silver if she was able to discover and divulge to them the secret of Samson's strength, following the folktales that some heroes' strength resides in an amulet or special item. The
source of Samson's power in this narrative is related to his status as a 'nazir', declared even before his birth, so here the traditional folk motif intertwines with particular theological topic of Samson's relationship to YHWH. Thus, Samson's mistake was his false belief that his strength is not contingent upon the symbol of his consecration to YHWH, so when shorn of his hair, Samson did not realize that YHWH had left him and that he had become vulnerable like normal men, so he could be caught and bound by his enemies.
Powerless in fetter and his eyes gouged, Samson was placed in the prison in Gaza, made to grind at a mill, usually a work of women, so the mighty hero had been feminized, as Sisera to Jael (Judges 4, 5).

Death of Samson (16:23–31)
Samson's rehabilitation and his final victory took place during a Philistine festival to honor  their god, Dagon, when the Philistines had Samson brought out for humiliation. Feigning weakness, Samson asked the lad who led him to be allowed to lean on the pillars of the great house that was filled with 3,000 Philistines. With a final prayer to God, Samson pushed the pillars, thereby broke down the roof of the house, killing himself and his enemies. The narrative ends with an admiration for Samson's final deed (verse 30) and a note of his honorable burial (verse 31).

Verse 31
And his brothers and all his father’s household came down and took him, and brought him up and buried him between Zorah and Eshtaol in the tomb of his father Manoah. He had judged Israel twenty years.
"Between Zorah and Eshtaol": This epilogue indicates that Samson's burial place was the same place where the Spirit first moved him (Judges 13:25) and thereby completes the theme of reconciliation with 'his brothers and all his father's household'.

See also

Related Bible parts: Judges 13, Judges 14, Judges 15, Hebrews 11

Notes

References

Sources

External links
 Jewish translations:
 Shoftim - Judges - Chapter 16 (Judaica Press). Hebrew text and English translation [with Rashi's commentary] at Chabad.org
 Christian translations:
 Online Bible at GospelHall.org (ESV, KJV, Darby, American Standard Version, Bible in Basic English)
 Judges chapter 16. Bible Gateway

16
Samson
Dagon